This is a list of victories of the  cycling team. The races are categorized according to the UCI Continental Circuits rules. The team was in the UCI Continental category from 2008 to 2018 then up to UCI Professional Continental from 2019 till present.

Sources:

Cyclo-cross

2009 BKCP–Powerplus 

 world championships, Niels Albert
 U23 world championships, Philipp Walsleben
 cyclo-cross championships, Philipp Walsleben
Duinencross Koksijde, Niels Albert
Superprestige Diegem, Niels Albert
Cyclo-cross Gavere, Niels Albert
Krawatencross, Niels Albert
Grand Prix Nommay, Niels Albert
Vlaamse Druivenveldrit Overijse, Niels Albert
Cyklokros Plzeň, Niels Albert
Grand Prix Lago le Bandie, Niels Albert

2010 BKCP–Powerplus 

 U23 world championships, Arnaud Jouffroy
 cyclo-cross Championships, Philipp Walsleben
Superprestige Diegem, Niels Albert
Grand Prix Adri van der Poel, Niels Albert
Ziklokross Igorre, Niels Albert
Duinencross Koksijde, Niels Albert
Azencross, Niels Albert
Scheldecross Antwerpen, Radomír Šimůnek, Jr.
Cyklokros Tábor, Radomír Šimůnek, Jr.

2011 BKCP–Powerplus 

 cyclo-cross Championships, Niels Albert
 cyclo-cross Championships, Philipp Walsleben
Overall Cyclo-cross World Cup, Niels Albert
Tervuren, Niels Albert
Grand Prix Adri van der Poel, Niels Albert
Sluitingsprijs Oostmalle, Niels Albert
Kalmthout, Niels Albert
Cyclo-cross Ruddervoorde, Niels Albert
Zonhoven, Niels Albert
Dottignies, Niels Albert
Superprestige Diegem, Niels Albert
Azencross, Niels Albert

2012 BKCP–Powerplus 

 world championships, Niels Albert
 cyclo-cross championships, Philipp Walsleben
Sluitingsprijs Oostmalle, Niels Albert
Cyclo-cross Ronse, Niels Albert
Cyklokros Plzeň, Niels Albert
Azencross, Niels Albert
Superprestige Diegem, Niels Albert

2013 BKCP–Powerplus 

 cyclo-cross championships, Philipp Walsleben
Overall UCI Cyclo-cross World Cup, Niels Albert
Krawatencross, Niels Albert
Sluitingsprijs Oostmalle, Niels Albert
Bollekescross, Niels Albert
Duinencross Koksijde, Niels Albert
Superprestige Gieten, Niels Albert
Memorial Romano Scotti, Niels Albert

2014 BKCP–Powerplus 

 cyclo-cross championships, Philipp Walsleben
Superprestige Gieten, Mathieu van der Poel
Sluitingsprijs Oostmalle, Niels Albert
Superprestige Gieten, Mathieu van der Poel
Superprestige Diegem, Mathieu van der Poel

Road cycling

2009 BKCP–Powerplus 
Prologue Boucles de la Mayenne, Niels Albert
Stage 2 & 5 Tour Alsace, Niels Albert
Stage 1 Mi-Août Bretonne, Niels Albert

2010 BKCP–Powerplus 
Stage 6 Circuito Montañés, Niels Albert

2011 BKCP–Powerplus 
Stage 2 Tour Alsace, Niels Albert
Stage 3 Mi-Août Bretonne, Philipp Walsleben

2012 BKCP–Powerplus 
Stage 4 Mi-Août Bretonne, Marcel Meisen

2013 BKCP–Powerplus 

Stage 3 Boucles de la Mayenne, Marcel Meisen
Stage 3 Tour Alsace, Philipp Walsleben
Stage 6 Tour Alsace, Marcel Meisen
Overall  Baltic Chain Tour, Philipp Walsleben
Stage 1, Philipp Walsleben
Stage 2, Marcel Meisen

2014 BKCP–Powerplus 
Ronde van Limburg, Mathieu van der Poel
Stage 3 Tour Alsace, Mathieu van der Poel
Overall Baltic Chain Tour, Mathieu van der Poel
Stage 4, Mathieu van der Poel

2017 Beobank–Corendon 

Stage 2 Tour of Belgium, Mathieu van der Poel
Overall Boucles de la Mayenne, Mathieu van der Poel
Stages 2 & 3, Mathieu van der Poel
KOGA Slag om Norg, Gianni Vermeersch
Dwars door het Hageland, Mathieu van der Poel

2018 Corendon–Circus 

Overall Boucles de la Mayenne, Mathieu van der Poel
Stage 1, Mathieu van der Poel
Ronde van Limburg, Mathieu van der Poel
 National Road Race Championships, Mathieu van der Poel
Stage 1 Tour Alsace, David van der Poel
Stages 1 & 4 Arctic Race of Norway, Mathieu van der Poel
Stage 3 Arctic Race of Norway, Adam Toupalik

2019 Corendon–Circus 

Stage 1 Tour of Antalya, Mathieu van der Poel
Stage 4 Tour of Antalya, Roy Jans
Grand Prix de Denain, Mathieu van der Poel
Dwars door Vlaanderen, Mathieu van der Poel
Stage 1 Circuit Cycliste Sarthe - Pays de la Loire, Mathieu van der Poel
Brabantse Pijl, Mathieu van der Poel
Amstel Gold Race, Mathieu van der Poel
Elfstedenronde, Tim Merlier
Halle Ingooigem, Dries De Bondt
 National Road Race Championships, Tim Merlier
Stage 1 Arctic Race of Norway, Mathieu van der Poel
Prologue TTT Tour Alsace
Stages 1 & 4 Tour Alsace, Tim Merlier
Stage 3 Danmark Rundt, Lasse Norman Hansen
Stage 5 Danmark Rundt, Tim Merlier
 Overall Tour of Britain, Mathieu van der Poel
Stages 4, 7 & 8 Mathieu van der Poel
Memorial Rik Van Steenbergen, Dries De Bondt

2020 Alpecin–Fenix 

Stage 3 Étoile de Bessèges, Dries De Bondt
Stage 4 Tour of Antalya, Tim Merlier
Dwars door het Hageland, Jonas Rickaert
 Overall Tour Bitwa Warszawska 1920, Oscar Riesebeek
Stage 3, Senne Leysen
Stage 4, Oscar Riesebeek
 National Road Race Championships, Marcel Meisen
 National Road Race Championships, Mathieu van der Poel
Brussels Cycling Classic, Tim Merlier
Stage 6 Tirreno–Adriatico, Tim Merlier
Stage 7 Tirreno–Adriatico, Mathieu van der Poel
Antwerp Port Epic, Gianni Vermeersch
 National Road Race Championships, Dries De Bondt
 Overall BinckBank Tour, Mathieu van der Poel
Stage 5, Mathieu van der Poel
Tour of Flanders, Mathieu van der Poel

2021 Alpecin–Fenix 

Stage 1 UAE Tour, Mathieu van der Poel  
Le Samyn, Tim Merlier
Strade Bianche, Mathieu van der Poel
Grote Prijs Jean-Pierre Monseré, Tim Merlier
Stages 3 & 5 Tirreno–Adriatico, Mathieu van der Poel
Bredene Koksijde Classic, Tim Merlier
Scheldeprijs, Jasper Philipsen
Stages 6 & 7 Presidential Tour of Turkey, Jasper Philipsen
Stage 2 Giro d'Italia, Tim Merlier
Ronde van Limburg, Tim Merlier
Stage 1 Boucles de la Mayenne, Philipp Walsleben
Elfstedenronde, Tim Merlier
Stages 2 & 3 Tour de Suisse, Mathieu van der Poel
 National Road Race Championships, Silvan Dillier
Stage 2 Tour de France, Mathieu van der Poel
Stage 3 Tour de France, Tim Merlier
Stage 1 Vuelta a Burgos, Edward Planckaert
Stage 4 Arctic Race of Norway, Philipp Walsleben
Stages 2 & 5 Vuelta a España, Jasper Philipsen
Stages 1 & 4 Benelux Tour, Tim Merlier
Antwerp Port Epic, Mathieu van der Poel
Stage 3 Tour de Luxembourg, Sacha Modolo
Kampioenschap van Vlaanderen, Jasper Philipsen
Eschborn–Frankfurt, Jasper Philipsen
Grand Prix de Denain, Jasper Philipsen
Paris-Chauny, Jasper Philipsen
Giro del Veneto, Xandro Meurisse

2022 Alpecin–Fenix 

Stage 4 Tour of Antalya, Jakub Mareczko
Stages 1 & 5 UAE Tour, Jasper Philipsen
Stage 2 Tirreno–Adriatico, Tim Merlier
Nokere Koerse, Tim Merlier
Classic Brugge–De Panne, Tim Merlier
Stage 4 Settimana Internazionale di Coppi e Bartali, Mathieu van der Poel
Dwars door Vlaanderen, Mathieu van der Poel
Tour of Flanders, Mathieu van der Poel
Stage 3 Tour of Turkey, Jasper Philipsen
 Four Days of Dunkirk
Stage 4, Lionel Taminiaux
Stage 5, Gianni Vermeersch
 Giro d'Italia
Stage 1, Mathieu van der Poel
Stage 12, Stefano Oldani
Stage 18, Dries De Bondt
Stage 3 ZLM Tour, Jakub Mareczko
Dwars door het Hageland, Oscar Riesebeek
Stage 2 Tour of Belgium, Jasper Philipsen
 National U23 Time Trial Championships, Maurice Ballerstedt
 National Road Race Championships, Tim Merlier
Stages 15 & 21 Tour de France, Jasper Philipsen
 Overall Tour de Wallonie, Robert Stannard
Stage 4 Danmark Rundt, Jasper Philipsen
Stage 6 & 8 Vuelta a España, Jay Vine
Grand Prix de Wallonie, Mathieu van der Poel
Omloop van het Houtland, Jasper Philipsen
Coppa Ugo Agostoni, Sjoerd Bax
Paris–Bourges, Jasper Philipsen
Memorial Rik Van Steenbergen, Tim Merlier
 Tour de Langkawi
Stage 4, Jakub Mareczko
Stage 5, Lionel Taminiaux
Stage 7, Sjoerd Bax

2023 Alpecin–Deceuninck 

Stages 3 & 7 Tirreno–Adriatico, Jasper Philipsen
Milan–San Remo, Mathieu van der Poel

Supplementary stats

Notes

References 

BKCP
Alpecin–Fenix